The Strand at Coolangatta is a shopping centre in Coolangatta, Gold Coast, Queensland. Anchor tenants include Woolworths and Aldi.

References

External links
Official Site

Coolangatta
Shopping centres on the Gold Coast, Queensland